Flor Pálida ("Pale Flower") is a song written and performed by Cuban singer-songwriter Polo Montañez. It was recorded for his second and final studio album Guitarra Mía (2002). It is the tenth track on the album. On the review of the album, Newsreview.com editor Christine G.K. LaPado-Breglia praised the song as "so beautiful, with its plaintive violin and heart-stirring vocals".

Marc Anthony version

In 2013, American recording artist Marc Anthony covered "Flor Pálida" on his album 3.0. Released as the third single from the album, Anthony's cover was arranged and produced by American musician Sergio George. Hector Aviles from Latino Music Cafe called Anthony's cover "a great tribute to Polo’s original version with his performance." New York Times editor Ben Ratliff referred "Flor Pálida" along with "Espera" and "Cautivo de Este Amor" as the "best of the kind". A.D. Amorosi of the Philadelphia Inquirer called the song "impresionante".

Charts

Year-end charts

References

2002 songs
Cuban songs
Marc Anthony songs
Spanish-language songs
Song recordings produced by Sergio George
2014 singles
Sony Music Latin singles